Kumara was a parliamentary electorate in the West Coast region of New Zealand, from 1881 to 1890.

Population centres
The previous electoral redistribution was undertaken in 1875 for the 1875–1876 election. In the six years since, New Zealand's European population had increased by 65%. In the 1881 electoral redistribution, the House of Representatives increased the number of European representatives to 91 (up from 84 since the 1875–76 election). The number of Māori electorates was held at four. The House further decided that electorates should not have more than one representative, which led to 35 new electorates being formed, including Kumara, and two electorates that had previously been abolished to be recreated. This necessitated a major disruption to existing boundaries.

The electorate got its name from the town of Kumara. The northern boundary of the electorate was the Taramakau River over its entire length (i.e. up to Harper's Pass). The eastern boundary was the old boundary between the Canterbury and Westland Provinces.

In the 1887 electoral redistribution, the northern boundary shifted further north, and Lake Brunner was gained.

History
The electorate was represented by one Member of Parliament, the future Premier Richard Seddon, known as 'King Dick'. He became Premier in 1893.

Members of Parliament
Key

Election results

1887 election

1884 election

1881 election

Notes

References

Historical electorates of New Zealand
1881 establishments in New Zealand
1890 disestablishments in New Zealand